Brian Saramago (born November 9, 1998) is an American soccer player who plays as a forward for B-SAD in Liga Portugal 2.

Career
Saramago is a member of the New York Red Bulls Academy. During the 2014/15 season he led New York Red Bulls U-15/16 team with 31 goals in 32 matches. During the 2015/16 season he led New York Red Bulls U18 team with 25 goals in 25 matches.

Saramago made his debut for the New York Red Bulls II on June 6, 2015 against FC Montreal. He came on as a 72nd-minute substitute for Juan Sebastían Sánchez as the match ended 2–2.

In April 2021, Saramago signed with Long Island Rough Riders of USL League Two.

Career statistics

References

External links 
 Top Drawer Soccer Profile.
 New York Red Bulls U-15/16 (2014-2015)

1998 births
People from New Hyde Park, New York
Sportspeople from Nassau County, New York
Soccer players from New York (state)
Living people
American soccer players
United States men's youth international soccer players
Association football forwards
Loyola Greyhounds men's soccer players
New York Red Bulls II players
New York Red Bulls U-23 players
Long Island Rough Riders players
NK Rudar Velenje players
USL Championship players
USL League Two players
Slovenian Second League players
Liga Portugal 2 players
American expatriate soccer players
Expatriate footballers in Slovenia
American expatriate sportspeople in Slovenia
Expatriate footballers in Portugal
American expatriate sportspeople in Portugal